"Acqua e sale" (Spanish: Agua y sal; English: Salt and Water) is a song written by Gianni Donzelli and Vincenzo Leomporro from the band Audio 2. It was recorded by Italian singers Mina and Adriano Celentano in 1998 for their collaborative album Mina/Celentano. It was produced by Massimiliano Pani. It was certified gold record in the Italian charts in 2017 and platinum record in 2019.

Mina would later re-record the song in Spanish with Miguel Bosé. It is included in Mina's album Todavía (2007) and Bosé's Papito.

Charts

Certifications

References

Adriano Celentano songs
Italian songs
Miguel Bosé songs
Mina (Italian singer) songs
Spanish songs
Male–female vocal duets
1998 singles
1998 songs